The Presidential Young Investigator Award (PYI) was awarded by the National Science Foundation of the United States Federal Government. The program operated from 1984 to 1991, and was replaced by the NSF Young Investigator (NYI) Awards and Presidential Faculty Fellows Program (PFF) and subsequently the NSF CAREER Awards and the PECASE.

Applicants could not directly apply for the award, but were nominated by others including their own institutions based on their previous record of scientific achievement. The award, a certificate from the White House signed by the President of the United States, included a minimum grant of $25,000 a year for five years from NSF to be used for any scientific research project the awardee wished to pursue, with the possibility of additional funding up to $100,000 annually if the PYI obtained matching funds from industry.  Considered to be one of the highest honors granted by the National Science Foundation, the award program was criticized in 1990 as not being the best use of NSF funds in an era of tight budgets.

Recipients 
PYI award recipients include:
 Narendra Ahuja, computer science, 1984
 Alice Agogino, engineering, 1985
 Paul Alivisatos, chemistry, 1991
 Peter B. Armentrout, chemistry, 1984
 David P. Anderson, computer science
Kenneth Balkus, chemistry, 1991
 Prithviraj Banerjee, computer systems architecture, 1987
 Paul F. Barbara, chemistry, 1984
 Christoph Beckermann, mechanical engineering, 1989
 Mary Beckman, linguistics, 1988
 Mladen Bestvina, mathematics, 1988
 Sanjay Banerjee, electrical engineering, 1988
 Jonathan Block, mathematics, 1993
 Rogers Brubaker, sociology, 1994
 Robert Bryant, mathematics, 1984
 Stephen Z. D. Cheng, polymer science, 1991
 Paul Alan Cox, evolutionary ecology and ethnobotany, 1985
 Judith Curry, climate science, 1988
 Supriyo Datta, electrical engineering, 1984
 Rina Dechter, computer science, 1991
Chris Q. Doe, Biology, 1990
 Bruce Donald, computational biology, 1989
 David L. Donoho, statistics, 1985
 Lin Fanghua, mathematics, 1989
 Juli Feigon, biochemistry, 1989
 Eric Fossum, electrical engineering, 1986
 Jennifer Freyd, psychology
 Elaine Fuchs, cell biology, 1984-1989
 Gerald Fuller, chemical engineering
 Huajian Gao, materials science
 Mark S. Ghiorso, geological sciences, 1985
 Leslie Greengard, advanced comp research program and computational mathematics, 1990
Mark Henderson, mechanical engineering, 1987
 Bruce Hajek, 1984
 John L. Hennessy, computer science, 1984
 Jacqueline Hewitt, physics, 1991
David Hillis, evolutionary biology, 1987
 John M. Hollerbach, haptics and tactile perception, 1984
 Kathleen Howell, astronomy, 1984
 Ellen Hildreth, computer vision, 1987
 Paul Hudak, computer science, 1985
 Christopher R. Johnson, computer graphics and visualization, 1994
 Nan Marie Jokerst, electrical engineering, 1990
 Moshe Kam, electrical engineering, 1990
 David B. Kaplan, physics, 1990
 Mehran Kardar, physics, 1989
 Karen Kavanagh, physics, 1991
 Susan Kidwell, geology, 1986
 Vijay Kumar (roboticist), 1991
 Jacqueline Krim, materials research, 1986
 James W. LaBelle, physics, 1990
Robert L. Last, plant biology, 1990
 Edward A. Lee, electrical engineering, 1997
 Kevin K. Lehmann, chemistry, 1985
 Charles E. Leiserson, computer science, 1985
 Nathan Lewis, analytical and surface chemistry, 1988
 John H. Lienhard V, mechanical engineering, 1988
 John Edwin Luecke, mathematics, 1992
 Udi Manber, computer science, 1985
 Eric Mazur, physics
 Mark McMenamin, geology, 1988
 Eckart Meiburg, mechanical engineering, 1990
 Fulvio Melia, astrophysics, 1988
 Carolyn Meyers, chemical engineering
 Michael I. Miller, biomedical engineering
 Robert F. Murphy (computational biologist), 1983
 Monica Olvera de la Cruz, Materials Physics, 1989
 Jon Orloff, physics, 1984
 Randy Pausch, computer science
Gregory A. Voth, Chemistry, 1991
 Joseph R. Pawlik, biological oceanography, 1991
 Ken Perlin, computer graphics, 1991
 Ronald T. Raines, chemical biology
 Lisa Randall, theoretical physicist,  1992
 Eric Sven Ristad, artificial intelligence, 1992
 Mark O. Robbins, Materials Research, 1985
 Ares J. Rosakis, 1985
 Karl Rubin, mathematics
Rob A. Rutenbar, computer engineering, 1987
 Sunil Saigal, civil engineering, 1990
 Peter Salovey, psychology
 Aziz Sancar, molecular biophysics, 1984
 Robert Sapolsky, neuroendocrinology
 Terrence Sejnowski, neuroscience, 1984
 Michael Steer, electrical engineering, 1986
 Joann Stock, earth science, 1990
 Howard A. Stone, chemical, bioengineering, environmental, and transport systems, 1989
 Steven Strogatz, mathematics, 1990
 Éva Tardos, algorithm analysis
 Patricia Thiel, chemistry, 1985
 Masaru Tomita, computational biology, 1988
 Mary K. Vernon, computer science, 1985
 Jeffrey Vitter, computer science, 1985
 Margaret Werner-Washburne, molecular biology, 1990
 Ellen D. Williams (scientist), materials research, 1984
 Martin Yarmush, biochemical engineering, 1988
 Todd Yeates, biochemistry, 1991
 Alex Zettl, physics, 1984
 Steven Zimmerman, chemistry
 Munther A. Dahleh, 1991
 Yannis Ioannidis, 1991.

NSF Presidential Faculty Fellowship 
The NSF Presidential Faculty Fellowship (PFF) program was launched by President George H.W. Bush to honor 30 young engineering and science professors. The awards were up to $100,000 per year for 5 years.

PFF recipients 
 David Culler, Computer Science, 1992
 Theodore (Ted) Rappaport, Wireless Communications, 1992
 Rebecca Richards-Kortum, Electrical/Bioengineering, 1992
 Louise H. Kellogg, Geophysics, 1992

See also 

 PECASE

References 

Federal government of the United States
Science and technology awards